Claudio Taddei (December 22, 1966 – August 9, 2019) was a Uruguayan-Swiss singer-songwriter and painter.

References

1966 births
2019 deaths
Uruguayan emigrants to Switzerland
Uruguayan singer-songwriters
Swiss singer-songwriters
20th-century Uruguayan painters
20th-century Uruguayan male artists
Uruguayan male artists
20th-century Swiss painters
21st-century Swiss painters
Male painters
20th-century Swiss male artists
21st-century Swiss male artists